Pugh Rogefeldt, real name Anders Sture Torbjörn Rogefeldt (born 2 March 1947 in Västerås, Sweden), is a Swedish singer, musician, guitarist and songwriter.

Musical career
Rogefeldt made his breakthrough in the late 1960s with albums such as Ja, dä ä dä and Pughish. Unlike most other Swedish pop musicians who wanted to achieve international success, he sang in Swedish. One song which is commonly associated with Rogefeldt is "Små lätta moln". Other major hits include "Här kommer natten", "Föräldralåten", "Hog Farm", "Dinga Linga Lena" and "Stockholm". In the 1970s, he toured with this band Rainrock, together with Ola Magnell and Janne Lucas Persson. A live double LP was released from this tour, entitled Ett steg till.

In the early 1990s, he was also a member of Grymlings, alongside Göran Lagerberg, Mikael Rickfors and  Magnus Lindberg.

The intro from Rogefeldt's "Love, Love, Love" track (from the 1969 album Ja, Dä Ä Dä!) is notable for being sampled and used by DJ Shadow on "Mutual Slump" (from the 1996 album Endtroducing.....).

Discography

Album
1969 – Ja, dä ä dä
1970 – Pughish
1972 – Hollywood
1973 – Pugh on the Rocks
1974 – Bolla och Rulla
1975 – Ett steg till
1977 – Bamalama
1978 – Attityder
1981 – Het
1983 – Face
1985 – Hammarhjärta
1986 – Pugh Rogefeldt
1991 – Människors Hantverk
1999 – Pugh Maraton
2008 – Vinn hjärta vinn

Collections
2003 – Pugh Boxen
2003 – Pughs Bästa
2012 – Dä Va' Då Dä' Pugh Rogefeldts Bästa 1969–2012

with Grymlings
1990 – Grymlings
1992 – Grymlings II

Notes

References

External links
 Pugh Rogefeldt's website

Swedish-language singers
Swedish male singers
Swedish composers
Swedish male composers
People from Västerås
1947 births
Living people